Giovanni Antonio Santorio (died May 1628) was a Roman Catholic prelate who served as Bishop of Policastro (1610–1628).

On 26 April 1610, Giovanni Antonio Santorio was appointed by Pope Paul V as Bishop of Policastro. He served as Bishop of Policastro until his death in May 1628. While bishop, he was the principal co-consecrator of Benedikt Orsini, Bishop of Lezhë, and Pietro Budi, Bishop of Sapë.

References

External links and additional sources
 (for Chronology of Bishops) 
 (for Chronology of Bishops) 

1628 deaths
17th-century Italian Roman Catholic bishops
Bishops appointed by Pope Paul V